The general notion of cryptocurrencies in Europe denotes the processes of legislative regulation, distribution, circulation, and storage of cryptocurrencies in Europe. 

There is still no unified regulatory framework regarding cryptocurrencies in the European Union. However, various authorities within the EU have given several legal initiatives for creating the consensus on key issues of cryptocurrency distribution.

The legality of cryptocurrencies in Europe 
There are some regulatory policy recommendations for EU states to follow in the course of cryptocurrency adoption and regulatory framework development that are given below in chronological order.

In 2013, the European Banking Authority (EBA) issued a public warning about the possible risks of virtual currencies.

In 2014, The EBA issued a decision on virtual currencies, which included a list of more than 70 risks associated with its dissemination.

In 2016, the European Central Bank issued an analysis of virtual currency schemes, acknowledging the potential advantages of virtual currencies.

The European Securities and Markets Authority (ESMA) published a study in 2017 on the use of distributed ledger technology (DLT) in securities markets.

Also in the same year, ESMA released two statements on initial coin offerings (ICOs), one on investor risks and the other on the laws that apply to companies that participate in these offers. After that, the European Commission directed the EBA and ESMA to evaluate the applicability and appropriateness of the existing EU financial services regulatory framework to crypto assets.

In 2018, the European Parliament released two reports about virtual currencies and central banks’ monetary policy.

In 2018, The Financial Stability Board (FSB) released a study on the crypto asset market and its potential pathways for future financial stability concerns.

During the G7 meeting of July 2019 risks posed by global stablecoin projects were discussed.

FINMA, the Swiss financial authority, published a supplement to its ICO guidelines outlining how it treats so-called ‘stable coins’ under Swiss supervisory law.

In 2019, ECB highlighted the paper series with a discussion about stability in crypto-assets.

In September 2020, The European Commission has today adopted a new Digital Finance Package, including Digital Finance and Retail Payments Strategies, and legislative proposals on crypto-assets and digital resilience.

In 2020, the ECB released a report about stablecoins’ regulatory status.

In 2020, the European Commission proposed a pilot regime for market infrastructures that wish to try to trade and settle transactions in financial instruments in crypto-asset form.

In July 2021, The European Central Bank is launching a pilot project for the "digital euro". Also, it has officially launched a 2-year-long study on the creation of a Digital Euro and the various nuances that would involve.

In July 2021, the European Commission released a statement that would apply what is known as the travel rule to crypto transactions to make them more traceable.

In September 2021, European Securities and Markets Authority published a report on Trends, Risks and Vulnerabilities where crypto assets are considered a high-risked innovational financial technology.

Cryptocurrency market   
According to Chainalysis, Europe's growth was largely driven by so-called "whales", large institutional investors shifting enormous sums of cryptocurrency.

According to Chainalysis, Europe has the world's largest crypto economy, collecting $1 trillion in the previous year, or 25% of all crypto activity worldwide.

Different countries have their own approach to cryptocurrencies legalization, distribution, and storage.

Germany 
Germany continues implementing crypto into the national regulation. First, they started with licensing crypto custody service providers and defining crypto assets as financial instruments. Now private funds are allowed to keep 20% of their investments in crypto.

In August 2020, the Ministry of Finance and the Ministry of Justice of Germany promulgated a bill to regulate electronic securities in the country (eWpG-E).

United Kingdom 
Although the United Kingdom affirmed in 2020 that crypto assets are property, it has no cryptocurrency regulations and does not consider cryptocurrencies to be legal tender.

Mining of cryptocurrencies is permitted.

In March 2022, the Financial Conduct Authority (FCA) declared that all cryptocurrency ATMs in the country were illegal and would need to be shut down. None of the ATM's operators had successfully registered with the agency. The FCA cited a failure to comply with know your customer laws (KYC), which track and prevent money laundering, as well as the high risk to customers, due to a lack of regulation and protection. At the time, Coin ATM Radar listed 81 such ATMs in the country.

Ukraine 
In September 2021, the Parliament of Ukraine passed a law to legalize cryptocurrency. The law divided virtual currencies into secured and unsecured assets and establishes an obligation for crypto service providers to comply with anti-money laundering laws.

The Netherlands 
In July 2020, The Dutch Central Bank (DNB) said the euro system's central bank digital currency (CBDC) should be more programmable than Bitcoin.

Estonia 
Estonia published its AML Bill as early as 2018. According to the Organization for Economic Cooperation and Development (OECD), Estonia's tax policy is one of the most competitive in the world. There is no income tax in this jurisdiction, therefore funds received through ICOs are not subject to it, and Bitcoin and altcoins are not subject to VAT.

France 
Government policy appears to be supportive of crypto, if it would be possible to regulate. In March 2020, the Central Bank of France began to study the topic of CBDC, in May it sold securities for the digital euro, and in September 2020, France announced the launch of CBDC based on the Tezos blockchain.

Spain 
In Spain, there is no specific virtual currencies' legislation, except for the law approved in July 2021 on preventing and fighting tax evasion.

See also 
 Central bank digital currency

References 

Cryptocurrencies
Finance in Europe
Economy of Europe